John Peter Hill (18 November 1933 – 16 April 1993) was a British powerboat racer. Hill began his boating career in 1960. In 1990, he won the F1 Powerboat World Championship.

References

1933 births
1993 deaths
British motorboat racers
Formula 1 Powerboat drivers